Memorial Drive may refer to:

Streets and roads
 Memorial Drive (Arlington National Cemetery), Virginia
 Memorial Drive (Atlanta), Georgia
 Memorial Drive (Calgary), Alberta
 Memorial Drive (Cambridge), Massachusetts
 Memorial Drive (Chicopee, Massachusetts)
 Memorial Drive (Houston), Texas
 Memorial Drive (St. Louis), Missouri
 Memorial Drive (Tulsa), Oklahoma
 Memorial Drive (Wollongong), New South Wales, Australia
 War Memorial Drive, Adelaide

Places
 Memorial Drive Park, a tennis complex in Adelaide, South Australia